David Charles Manners  is a British writer published in four languages, and a member of the Writers' Guild of Great Britain.  He is the co-founder of Sarvashubhamkara,  a charity that provides medical care, education and human contact to socially excluded individuals and communities on the Indian subcontinent, most of whom are affected by the stigma of leprosy.

He was awarded the British Empire Medal in the Queen's Birthday Honours 2022 Overseas and International List: Order of the British Empire, "For services to leprosy sufferers and their children in India and Nepal".

Early life
Manners is of British, French, Swedish and Ashkenazi ancestry. According to Manners, his mother was raised in Sussex, his father on India's North-West Frontier and in East Punjab.

Career
Manners worked as a theatre designer, primarily with Adventures in Motion Pictures.  He was appointed Design Associate with the company in 1992.  His designs included Matthew Bourne's Infernal Galop (1989; revived 1992), Deadly Serious (1992), The Percys of Fitzrovia (1992) and Drip: a Narcissistic Love Story (BBC's Dance for the Camera, 1993).  2012 saw Infernal Galop revived by Bourne's New Adventures, as part of the 20th anniversary celebrations of the founding of his companies.

He also designed the first Italian translation of Bernstein's Candide for Graham Vick at Batignano, Tuscany.

Awarded a BA degree in Music from Newton Park College, Bath, he went on to train in physical medicine and subsequently worked for thirteen years as physical therapist with musicians, conductors and singers at Glyndebourne Festival Opera.

He is a contributor to various journals including the National Geographic Traveller magazine.

His first book, In the Shadow of Crows, was published in 2009 by Reportage Press. A second edition, published by Signal Books, was released in August 2011.

Manners spent 2011 in collaboration with Jerwood Award-winning choreographer and director Ben Wright, creating text to inspire a new work for the dance company bgroup, which was taken on a national tour in the UK.

His second book, Limitless Sky, was released by Rider (imprint), a Random House division, in June 2014.  It has subsequently been published in translation, in both Lithuanian and Turkish.  Lithuania's television channel tv3 recommended Limitless Sky in its 20 Best Books for the Summer in 2015.

In 2015, Manners was interviewed for inclusion in the schools handbook How to Create Kind Schools by Jenny Hulme (published by Jessica Kingsley), to celebrate the 30th anniversary of the national anti-bullying charity Kidscape.

Manners's play Picture Perfect is based on the life of his relation Margaret Chute, Hollywood's first freelance film journalist and photographer.  Picture Perfect opened in July 2021 at the Stables Theatre, Hastings, starring Olivier Award-winning Liza Sadovy directed by Tony Graham.  Picture Perfect is now in pre-production with commercial theatre producers Beckman Unicorn.

Manners was commissioned to write for The Stables Theatre, Hastings.  Here at Last is Love is based on personal interviews and unpublished letters written by members of the Pink Sink set – a group of gay army officers and M.I.5 agents, who met at the lower bar at London's Ritz Hotel during the Blitz.  These men included Terence Rattigan, Desmond Carrington, Paul Dehn, Dunstan Thompson and Michael Pitt-Rivers, all of whom gathered around a socially-ostracised, single mother affectionately known as Sodomy Johnson, 'the Buggers' Vera Lynn'.  Here at Last is Love opened in May 2022, directed by Jason Morell.  In January 2023, it was announced as one of four productions nominated nationally for the NODA Best Show Award.

Works

References

External links
 

1965 births
Living people
British writers
People from Eastbourne
People from Epsom
People from Lichfield
Recipients of the British Empire Medal